Pavlišov is a village in Náchod District in the Hradec Králové Region of the Czech Republic. It is situated close to the border with Poland.

References

Villages in Náchod District